

Emperors table 
There were nine emperors of the Liao dynasty. The Liao dynasty was a Khitan-led dynasty of China that at its height ruled over what is now Shanxi, Hebei, Liaoning, Jilin, Heilongjiang, and Inner Mongolia provinces in China, as well as portions of the Korean peninsula, portions of the Russian Far East, and much of the Mongolian Plateau.

For emperors of the Northern Liao and Qara Khitai (Western Liao), see Northern Liao#Monarchs and Qara Khitai#Sovereigns of Qara Khitai.

Emperors family tree

Timeline 

Legend:
  denotes Liao monarchs
  denotes Northern Liao monarchs
  denotes Western Liao monarchs

References

Citations

Sources 

 
 
 

Lists of Chinese monarchs
Lists of leaders of China
Lists of Chinese people